Fallout 3 is a 2008 action role-playing game developed by Bethesda Game Studios and published by Bethesda Softworks. The third major installment in the Fallout series, it is the first game to be developed by Bethesda after acquiring the rights to the franchise from Interplay Entertainment. The game marks a major shift in the series by using 3D graphics and real-time combat, replacing the 2D isometric graphics and turn-based combat of previous installments. It was released worldwide in October 2008 for Microsoft Windows, PlayStation 3, and Xbox 360.

The game is set within a post-apocalyptic, open world environment that encompasses a scaled region consisting of the ruins of Washington, D.C., and much of the countryside to the north and west of it, referred to as the Capital Wasteland. It takes place within Fallout usual setting of a world that deviated into an alternate timeline thanks to atomic age technology, which eventually led to its devastation by a nuclear apocalypse in the year 2077 (referred to as the Great War), caused by a major international conflict between the United States and China over natural resources and the last remaining supplies of untapped uranium and crude oil. The main story takes place in the year 2277, around 36 years after the events of Fallout 2, of which it is not a direct sequel. Players take control of an inhabitant of Vault 101, one of several underground shelters created before the Great War to protect around 1,000 humans from the nuclear fallout, who is forced to venture out into the Capital Wasteland to find their father after he disappears from the Vault under mysterious circumstances. They find themselves seeking to complete their father's work while fighting against the Enclave, the corrupt remnants of the former U.S. Government that seeks to use it for their own purposes.

Fallout 3 was met with universal acclaim and received a number of Game of the Year awards, praising the game's open-ended gameplay and flexible character-leveling system, and is considered one of the best video games ever made. Fallout 3 sold more than Bethesda's previous game, The Elder Scrolls IV: Oblivion and shipped almost 5 million copies in its first week. The game received post-launch support, with Bethesda releasing five downloadable add-ons. The game was met with controversy upon release in Australia, for the recreational drug use and the ability to be addicted to alcohol and other drugs, and in India, for cultural and religious sentiments over the mutated cattle in the game being called Brahmin, a varna (class) in Hinduism. The game was followed by spin-off Fallout: New Vegas, developed by Obsidian Entertainment in 2010. The fourth major installment in the Fallout series, Fallout 4, was released in 2015.

Gameplay
Unlike previous titles of the series, Fallout 3 is played from the first-person perspective. The players have the option to switch between this and an "over-the-shoulder" third-person perspective at any time after the initial stages of the game. While many elements from previous titles are reused, such as the S.P.E.C.I.A.L. system, and the types of enemy encountered, major elements in the combat system are added, changed, or removed.

Character creation and attributes

Character creation is done through a tutorial prologue that encompasses the different ages of the player's character, which also covers tutorials on movement, the HUD, combat, interactions with the game world, and the use of the Pip-Boy 3000. The character's creation is done in steps, with the player first setting up their appearance along with what race and gender their character is, and the name they have. Next, they customize their character's primary attributes via the S.P.E.C.I.A.L. system (Strength, Perception, Endurance, Charisma, Intelligence, Agility, and Luck) which is retained in Fallout 3, and determines the base level of the Skills the character has. Which three Skills their character focuses on can either be left to the choices they make with a series of questions, or by choosing manually what they desire.

Character creation is not finalized until the player leaves Vault 101 and enters the Capital Wasteland, allowing players the option to modify their character's appearance, primary attributes and Skill choices if they are not satisfied with their choices. As the character progresses through the game, experience points (XP) are earned from accomplishing various actions, such as completing a quest, killing an enemy, and so forth, with a new level granted upon reaching the necessary amount of XP. A new level grants the player the ability to allocate points to the various Skills available and thus improve upon them, making them more effective; for instance, a higher lock-picking skill allows the player to be able to tackle more difficult locks on doors and containers, while a higher medicine skill increases the amount of health recovered with Stimpaks. Once the character achieves their second level, they can be granted a Perk, which offers advantages of varying quality and form, such as being able to carry more items, finding more ammo in containers, and having a higher chance to perform a critical hit. Many Perks have a set of prerequisites that need to be satisfied, often requiring a certain Skill level to acquire them, while a new Perk can be granted for every two levels earned by the character. Additional improvements to Skill levels can be made by finding Skill books, which confer a permanent boost to levels, while players can search for and find a series of 20 bobbleheads that confer a bonus to these and primary attributes.

An important statistic tracked by the game is Karma, which is affected by the decisions and actions the character performs during the game. Positive actions to Karma include freeing captives and helping others, while negative actions towards this include killing good characters and stealing. Actions vary in the level of karma change they cause; thus, pickpocketing produces less negative karma than the killing of a good character. Karma can have tangible effects to the player, beyond acting as flavor for the game's events, in that it can affect the ending the player gets, alter dialogue with non-player characters (NPCs) or give off unique reactions from other characters, while also granting access to certain perks that require a specific Karma level. However, the player's relationships with the game's factions are distinct, so any two groups or settlements may view the player in contrasting ways, depending on the player's conduct.

Health, weapons, and apparel
A character's health is divided between two types: HP (health points) and Limbs. While HP is the general amount of health that a character and other NPCs have (friendly, neutral, or hostile) and which depletes when damage is taken, either from combat, setting off traps, falling from a height or self injury, Limb health is specific to each portion of the body, namely the arms, legs, head, and torso, although non-human enemies feature additional appendages, and robotic enemies feature different types of appendages. Limbs can be damaged in the same way as HP, although once depleted they become crippled and induce a negative status effect, such as blurred vision if the head is crippled, or reduced movement speed if one or both legs are crippled. Both HP and Limbs can be recovered through the use of medical medicine in the form of Stimpaks, as well as sleeping and visiting a doctor, while HP can be slowly recovered by consuming food and drinking water and/or soft drinks. Players can also be affected by other negative health effects, including radiation poisoning and withdrawal symptoms. While the latter occurs when the player's character becomes addicted to alcohol or other drugs and confers negative effects if the player does not continue using them, radiation poisoning occurs when the character absorbs radiation, either by walking through areas with background radiation or consuming food and drink that is contaminated with a small amount of radiation. The negative impacts of both can affect S.P.E.C.I.A.L. attributes and can be treated by a doctor; radiation can be dealt with by using Rad Away. Furthermore, the amount of background radiation absorbed can be reduced through the use of Rad-X drugs and special apparel, both of which improve resistance to radiation.

All weapons and apparel found, regardless of whether they are a makeshift-weapon such as a lead pipe, or a gun, degrade over time the more they are used, and thus become less effective. For firearms, degrading into poor condition causes them to do less damage and possibly jam when reloading, while apparel that reduces damage becomes less protective as it gradually absorbs damage from attacks. When too much damage is taken, the items break and cannot be used. To ensure weapons and apparel continue to work effectively, such items require constant maintenance and repairs which can be done in one of two ways. The first method is to find certain vendors who can repair items, although how much they can repair an item depends on their skill level, while the cost of the repairs depends upon the cost of the item itself. The second method is for players to find a second of the same item that needs repairs (or a comparable item), and salvaging parts from it for the repair, although how much they can do depends on their character's repair skill. In addition to finding weaponry, the player can create their own. To craft such weapons, the player must use a workbench, possess either the necessary schematics or the right Perk, and scavenge for the items needed to make them. These weapons usually possess significant advantages over other weapons of their type. Each weapon's schematic has three copies that can be found, and possessing additional copies improves the condition (or number) of items produced at the workbench, while a higher repair skill will result in a better starting condition for the related weapon. Weapon schematics can be found lying in certain locations, bought from vendors, or received as quest rewards.

V.A.T.S.

The Vault-Tec Assisted Targeting System (V.A.T.S.) is a new element in the Fallout series that serves as a successor to the aimed shot mechanic from the earlier games, and plays an important part in combat within Fallout 3. The system was introduced by Bethesda's developers, who described it as a hybrid between timeturn-based and real-time combat, so much in that while using V.A.T.S., real-time combat is paused and action is played out from varying camera angles in a computer graphics version of bullet time. Using the system costs action points (AP), the amount of which depends on the weapon being used and thus limiting the actions of the player's combat during a turn. Through the system, the player can switch between multiple targets (if there is more than one around at any time), and also target specific areas of them to inflict damage; a player could either target the head for a quick kill, go for the legs to slow an enemy's movements, or shoot at their weapons to disarm them, and for some enemies, they can put them into a berserker rage by hitting specific parts. The chance of striking a different area, displayed as a percentage ratio, is dependent on the weapon being used, and the distance between the character and the target; a character who is a higher level when using V.A.T.S is also more likely to hit an enemy with the system than a lower level character. The use of V.A.T.S. does confer a negative effect, in that it eliminates most of the first-person shooter elements of the game; aiming is taken over by the computer, and the player is unable to move as a means of avoiding attacks. Furthermore, ranged weapons are capable of hitting limbs, while melee weapons focus on the target in whole when using V.A.T.S.

Companions
During their travels across the Wasteland, the player can be accompanied by a single NPC companion, who can assist in combat. Which companion can accompany the player depends on who they have encountered that can join them; it is possible to not encounter all depending on how the game is played. Only one companion may travel with the player, and should they wish to take another with them, the first must be dismissed (either voluntarily by the player or as a consequence of other events) or die in combat. One unique companion the player can have, that can allow a second to join without issue, is a dog named Dogmeat, who can be killed during the game if the player misuses him or places him in a severely dangerous situation; the release of the Broken Steel DLC, makes it possible to replace Dogmeat, provided the player acquires a Perk that grants the opportunity of getting another dog.

Plot

Setting

Fallout 3 takes place in the year 2277, and within the region that covers most of the ruined city of Washington, D.C., Northern Virginia, and parts of Maryland (mostly Montgomery County). The game's scaled landscape includes war-ravaged variants of numerous real-life landmarks, such as the White House, the Jefferson and Lincoln Memorials, Arlington National Cemetery, and the Washington Monument, with a small number of settlements dotted around the Capital Wasteland that consist of descendants of survivors from the Great War, including one that surrounds an unexploded bomb, another consisting primarily of ghoul inhabitants, and another formed within the hulking remains of an aircraft carrier. While the city can be explored, much of the interior zones are cut off by giant rubble over many of the roads leading in, meaning that access to some areas can only be achieved by using the ruins of the city's underground metro tunnels (loosely based on the real-life Washington Metro).

The region has two major factions within it: the Enclave and the Brotherhood of Steel. While the Enclave is similar in goal to their western brethren, the eastern branch of the Brotherhood of Steel seeks to assist the people of the Wasteland, although a small group rejected this and became outcasts who seek to resume their original goal of salvaging high-level technology. Other factions include former slaves who seek to inspire others for freedom by restoring the Lincoln Memorial, a group that feast on blood, and a group who tend and care for a region of the wastes where plants have become abundant.

Story
For the first 19 years of their life from 2258 to 2277, the player character grows up within the isolated confines of Vault 101 (designed to never be opened as a social experiment by the pre-war corporation known as Vault-Tec) alongside their father James, a doctor and scientist who assists in the Vault's clinic. While growing up, their father comments about their deceased mother Catherine and her favorite passage from the Bible (Revelation 21:6), which speaks of "the waters of life." Upon reaching their 19th birthday, chaos erupts when James suddenly leaves the Vault, causing the Overseer to lock down the Vault and send security guards after James' child. Escaping from the Vault with the aid of the Overseer's daughter Amata, the search for James across the Wasteland begins at the nearby town of Megaton, named for the undetonated atomic bomb at the center of town, and eventually into the ruins of Washington, D.C., and the Galaxy News Radio station, whereupon James' child, after helping the station's enthusiastic DJ Three Dog, is given the moniker of The Lone Wanderer. Directed by Three Dog towards Rivet City, a derelict aircraft carrier serving as a fortified human settlement, the Lone Wanderer meets with Doctor Madison Li, a scientist who worked alongside James. Li informs the Lone Wanderer that their parents were not born in Vault 101, but lived outside of it, where they worked together upon a plan they conceived to purify all the water in the Tidal Basin and eventually the entire Potomac River, with a giant water purifier built in the Jefferson Memorial, called Project Purity. However, constant delays and Catherine's death during childbirth forced James to abandon the project and seek refuge in Vault 101, where he took the Lone Wanderer to raise within a safe environment far away from the dangers of the wasteland.

Learning that James seeks to revive the project and continue his work by acquiring a Garden of Eden Creation Kit (G.E.C.K.), a powerful piece of technology issued by Vault-Tec intended to assist in rebuilding civilization after the war, the Lone Wanderer tracks him down to Vault 112, and frees him from a virtual reality program being run by the Vault's sadistic Overseer, Dr. Stanislaus Braun, whom James had sought out for information on a G.E.C.K.. Reunited with their father, the pair return to Rivet City and recruit Li and the other project members to resume work at the Jefferson Memorial. As they begin testing the project, the Memorial is invaded by the Enclave, a powerful military organization formed from the remnants of the United States government, which continues to remain active despite the demise of their brethren on the West Coast thirty years previously. Seeking to stop them from gaining control of his work, James urges the Lone Wanderer to finish his work and find a G.E.C.K. before flooding the project's control room with massive amounts of radiation, preventing the Enclave's military leader, Colonel Augustus Autumn, from taking control of it and killing himself in the process. Autumn survives, however, and the rest of the team flees from the remaining Enclave soldiers. The Lone Wanderer, accompanied by the remaining Project Purity members, make contact with the Brotherhood of Steel within the ruins of the Pentagon, now known as the Citadel. With their help, the Lone Wanderer travels to Vault 87 to find a G.E.C.K., which had been used as a testing site for the Forced Evolutionary Virus (FEV) and now as a breeding ground for the Super Mutants. The Lone Wanderer recovers the G.E.C.K. from within the Vault with the optional help of a friendly Super Mutant named Fawkes. As they make their way out, the Wanderer is ambushed by Colonel Autumn and the Enclave and is captured with the G.E.C.K confiscated.

At the Enclave base at Raven Rock, the Lone Wanderer is freed from their cell by the Enclave leader, President John Henry Eden, who requests a private audience with them, but Colonel Autumn defies Eden's orders, takes command of the Enclave's military, and orders the Lone Wanderer to be shot on sight. Despite the setback, the Wanderer meets with Eden who is revealed to be a sentient ZAX series supercomputer that took control of the Enclave after President Dick Richardson was killed on the West Coast. Seeking to repeat Richardson's plans, Eden reveals his intentions of using Project Purity to infect the water with a modified strain of FEV that will make it toxic to any mutated life, thus killing off most life in the Wasteland including humans. The Enclave, who would be immune to the effects because of their genetic purity as a result of their isolation, would be free to take control of the area. Forced to take a sample of the new FEV, the Wanderer leaves the base, regardless of doing so peacefully or convincing Eden to self-destruct. Returning to the Citadel, where news of the Enclave's possession of the G.E.C.K. is known to the Brotherhood, the Lone Wanderer joins them in a desperate final assault on the Jefferson Memorial, which is spearheaded through the use of a giant prewar military robot named Liberty Prime. After reaching the control room, the player has the choice to either convince Autumn to leave or kill him. Li informs the Wanderer that the purifier is ready for activation, but that the code must be inputted manually within the control room, meaning whoever goes in will be subjected to lethal amounts of radiation. To make matters worse, the purifier has been damaged and will self-destruct if not activated.

At this point, the Lone Wanderer can either:
 Do nothing and let the purifier explode, destroying the Jefferson Memorial and killing everyone inside in the process.
 Sacrifice themselves and input the right code that is hinted throughout the game.
 Send Sarah Lyons into the chamber and give her the right code.

Except for the first choice, the Lone Wanderer has the choice of introducing the modified FEV into the purifier or not, which further affects the ending. Whatever the choice, a bright light enshrouds all, and an ending slideshow begins, including any actions they took that had an influence on the wasteland.

Broken Steel ending
Although the main story ends here, the introduction of the Broken Steel DLC creates a new choice with the ending, in that the Lone Wanderer can send one of their radiation-immune companions, most notably Fawkes, into the chamber to input the code. Furthermore, the game remains open-ended from this point onwards, with the Wanderer surviving the radiation they were subjected to. The Wanderer wakes up two weeks later to the news that the purifier is working well and supplying clean water to the people of the Wasteland. However, if the player decides to infect the water purifier with the modified FEV, then adverse effects can be seen across the Capital Wasteland. The player's choice will also influence Sarah Lyons' fate. Sarah Lyons does not survive if sent into the chamber in the Broken Steel ending.

Development

Interplay Entertainment

Fallout 3 was initially under development by Black Isle Studios, a studio owned by Interplay Entertainment, under the working title Van Buren. Black Isle Studios was the developer of the original Fallout and Fallout 2. When Interplay Entertainment went bankrupt and closed down Black Isle Studios before the game could be completed, the license to develop Fallout 3 was sold for a $1,175,000 minimum guaranteed advance against royalties to Bethesda Softworks, a studio primarily known as the developer of The Elder Scrolls series. Bethesda's Fallout 3, however, was developed from scratch, using neither Van Buren code nor any other materials created by Black Isle Studios. In May 2007, a playable technology demo of the canceled project was released to the public.

Leonard Boyarsky, art director of the original Fallout, when asked about Interplay Entertainment's sale of the rights to Bethesda Softworks, said: "To be perfectly honest, I was extremely disappointed that we did not get the chance to make the next Fallout game. This has nothing to do with Bethesda, it's just that we've always felt that Fallout was ours and it was just a technicality that Interplay happened to own it. It sort of felt as if our child had been sold to the highest bidder, and we had to just sit by and watch. Since I have absolutely no idea what their plans are, I can't comment on whether I think they're going in the right direction with it or not."

Bethesda Softworks
Bethesda Softworks started working on Fallout 3 in July 2004, but principal development did not begin until after The Elder Scrolls IV: Oblivion and its related extras and plug-ins were completed. Bethesda Softworks made Fallout 3 similar to the previous two games, focusing upon non-linear gameplay, story, and black comedy. Bethesda pursued an ESRB rating of M (for "mature") by including the adult themes, violence, and depravity characteristic of the Fallout series. They shied away from the self-referential gags of the game's predecessors that broke the illusion that the world of Fallout is real. Fallout 3 uses a version of the same Gamebryo engine as Oblivion, and was developed by the team responsible for that game. Liam Neeson was cast as the voice of the player's father.

In February 2007, Bethesda stated that the game was "a fairly good ways away" from release but that detailed information and previews would be available later in the year. Following a statement made by Pete Hines that the team wanted to make the game a "multiple platform title", the game was announced by Game Informer to be in development for Windows, Xbox 360, and PlayStation 3. According to game director Todd Howard, the original plan was to recreate Washington, D.C., entirely in the game, but it was reconstructed by half; this was because a full implementation would require too complicated a job and an excessive long-term development.

During a March 21, 2008, Official Xbox Magazine podcast interview, Todd Howard revealed that the game had expanded to nearly the same scope as Oblivion. There were originally at least 12 versions of the final cutscene, but, with further development, this expanded to over 200 possible permutations in the final release, all of which are determined by the actions taken by the player.  Bethesda Softworks attended E3 2008 to showcase Fallout 3. The first live demo of the Xbox 360 version of the game was shown and demonstrated by Todd Howard, taking place in downtown Washington, D.C. The demo showcased various weapons such as the Fat Man nuclear catapult, the V.A.T.S. system and the functions of the Pip-Boy 3000 as well as combat with several enemies. The demo concluded as the player neared the Brotherhood of Steel-controlled Pentagon and was attacked by an Enclave patrol.

Howard confirmed that, in addition to thematics about slavery and cannibalism, there would be the presence of splatter scenes and exposition of evident mutilations on enemies with release of gibs. The inspiration to include scenes with such explicit violence came from the "crash mode" of the driving simulator series Burnout. Instead of cars that disintegrated because of the damage, the idea of applying kinematics on bodies who suffered wounds and mutilations due to ballistic trauma or beatings.

Emil Pagliarulo, a writer formerly at Looking Glass Studios, was commissioned by Bethesda to write the main script of Fallout 3. He also worked in part to The Elder Scrolls IV: Oblivions script. Pagliarulo took charge of writing the incipit of Fallout 3, then played by Ron Perlman, and he tried to be inspired by first Fallouts incipit, in 1997, which he considered vitally important to describe the story that Fallout 3 would have to tell. To succeed in making this script effective, Pagliarulo, had to go in the opposite direction to his previous work on Oblivion, which both for setting and characters, represented an extreme Fallout inverse.

The main model to follow, for Pagliarulo, was always the first Fallout, which by his own admission had more the peculiarity of synthesis in dialogues, rather than Fallout 2, which had a more blear and muddled screenplay written by Chris Avellone, who Pagliarulo would nonetheless describe as "a fantastic writer."

Music and audio
The score was composed by Inon Zur, who does not consider himself the only person responsible for the musical work on Fallout 3. Zur cited game director Todd Howard and the sound designer Mark Lambert for helping him to manage the in-game sound implementation, stating he made only 50%. Zur also said that he conceived the soundtrack based on what the player would perceive on psychological level, rather than on what the player would see on the screen, so placing the listener musically ahead over the environment in which he or she moves. Apart from a few exceptions, Inon Zur said that the soundtrack of the game was mainly composed using a sampler.

Several actors of film and video games lent their voices to Fallout 3, including Liam Neeson as James, Ron Perlman as the game's narrator, Malcolm McDowell as President John Henry Eden, Craig Sechler as Butch DeLoria, Erik Todd Dellums as Three Dog, and Odette Yustman as Amata Almodovar. Veteran voice actors Dee Bradley Baker, Wes Johnson, Paul Eiding, and Stephen Russell also provided voice-overs for the game. Blindlight manager Lev Chapelsky told Edge that his company tried to get former U.S. President Bill Clinton to voice Eden, though Bethesda said he was never seriously considered. The Fallout 3 soundtrack continued the series' convention of featuring sentimental 1940s American big band music, including the main theme, a few other incidental songs recorded by The Ink Spots and The Andrews Sisters, and songs by other artists such as Roy Brown, Billie Holiday, Billy Munn, Cole Porter, and Bob Crosby.

Marketing and release

Trailers
A teaser site for the game appeared on May 2, 2007, and featured music from the game and concept art, along with a timer that counted down to June 5, 2007. The artists and developers involved later confirmed that the concept art, commissioned before Oblivion had been released, did not reveal anything from the actual game. When the countdown finished, the site hosted the first teaser trailer for the game, and unveiled a release date of fall 2008. The press kit released with the trailer indicated that Ron Perlman would be on board with the project. The trailer featured The Ink Spots song "I Don't Want to Set the World on Fire", which the previous Fallout developer Black Isle Studios originally intended to license for use in the first Fallout game. The trailer, which was completely done with in-engine assets, closed with Ron Perlman saying his trademark line which he also spoke in the original Fallout: "War. War never changes." The trailer showed a devastated Washington, D.C., evidenced by the partially damaged Washington Monument in the background as well as the crumbling buildings that surrounded a rubble-choked city thoroughfare.

A second trailer was first shown during a GameTrailers TV E3 special on July 12, 2008. The trailer zoomed out from a ruined house in the Washington, D.C., suburbs, and provided a wider view of the capital's skyline including the Capitol Building and Washington Monument in the distance. On July 14, 2008, an extended version of this trailer was made available, which besides the original content, included a Vault-Tec advertisement and actual gameplay. Both versions of the trailer featured the song "Dear Hearts and Gentle People" as recorded by Bob Crosby and the Bobcats.

Film festival
On July 11, 2008, as a part of promoting Fallout 3, Bethesda Softworks partnered with American Cinematheque and Geek Monthly to sponsor A Post-Apocalyptic Film Festival Presented by Fallout 3. The festival took place on August 22–23 at Santa Monica's Aero Theater. Six post-apocalyptic movies were shown which depict life and events that could occur after a world-changing disaster, including Wizards, Damnation Alley, A Boy and His Dog, The Last Man on Earth, The Omega Man, and Twelve Monkeys.

Retail versions

Fallout 3 was released in five separate versions, three of which were made available worldwide:
 The Standard Edition includes the game disc and instruction manual.
 The Collector's Edition includes the game disc, manual, a bonus making-of disc, a concept artbook, and a 5" Vault Boy Bobblehead, all of which is contained in a Vault-Tec lunchbox. In Australia, the Collector's Edition was available at Gametraders and EB Games.
 The Limited Edition includes the game disc and manual, as well as a Brotherhood of Steel Power Armor figurine. This edition was available only in the UK through the retailer Game.
 The Survival Edition includes everything from the Collector's Edition, as well as a model of the Pip-Boy 3000 from the game which functions as a digital clock. The Survival Edition is available from Amazon.com to U.S. customers only.
 The Game of the Year Edition, which includes the original Fallout 3 game as well as all five of the downloadable content packs, was released on October 13, 2009, in North America and October 16, 2009 in Europe. It was released in Australia on October 22, 2009, and in Japan on December 3, 2009. It was made available on Steam on December 17, 2009. An Xbox 360 version of Fallout 3 and Oblivion double pack was announced for release in North America on April 3, 2012.

Downloadable content

Bethesda's Todd Howard confirmed during E3 2008 that downloadable content (DLC) would be prepared for the Xbox 360 and Windows versions of Fallout 3. There are five DLCs: Operation: Anchorage, The Pitt, Broken Steel, Point Lookout, and Mothership Zeta, released in that order. Of the five, Broken Steel has the largest effect on the game, altering the ending and allowing the player to continue playing past the end of the main quest line.

Originally, there was no downloadable content announced for the PlayStation 3 version of the game. Although Bethesda had not offered an explanation as to why the content was not released for PlayStation 3, Lazard Capital Markets analyst Colin Sebastian speculated that it may have been the result of a money deal with Bethesda by Sony's competitor, Microsoft. When asked if the PlayStation 3 version would receive an update that would enable gameplay beyond the main quest's completion, Todd Howard responded: "Not at this time, no." In May 2009, Bethesda announced that the existing DLC packs (Operation: Anchorage, The Pitt and Broken Steel) would be made available for the PlayStation 3; the later two (Point Lookout and Mothership Zeta) were released for all platforms.

On October 1, 2009, a New Xbox Experience premium theme for the game was released for the Xbox 360. Consumers could pay 240 Microsoft Points, or by having downloaded all other downloadable content. The PlayStation 3 received a free theme, featuring a Brotherhood of Steel Knight in the background, and includes symbols from the game as icons on the PS3 home menu. In December 2008, the editor known as the G.E.C.K. (Garden of Eden Creation Kit) was made available for the Windows version of the game as a free download from the Fallout 3 website.

Reception

Reviews

Fallout 3 received "universal acclaim" from critics, according to review aggregator Metacritic. 1UP.com's Demian Linn praised its open-ended gameplay and flexible character-leveling system. While the V.A.T.S. system was called fun, enemy encounters were said to suffer from a lack of precision in real-time combat and little variety in enemy types. The review concluded, Fallout 3 is a "hugely ambitious game that doesn't come around very often." IGN editor Erik Brudvig praised the game's "minimalist" sound design, observing how "you might find yourself with nothing but the sound of wind rustling through decaying trees and blowing dust across the barren plains ... Fallout 3 proves that less can be more." The review noted that the "unusual amount of realism" combined with the "endless conversation permutations" produces "one of the most truly interactive experiences of the generation." In a review of the game for Kotaku, Mike Fahey commented: "While Inon Zur's score is filled with epic goodness, the real stars of Fallout 3s music are the vintage songs from the 1940s."

Tim Cain, Fallout and Fallout 2 game director, praised the art direction and the attention to details in the game but did not like the way the endings were not enough constructed around player's actions and decisions. He was also critical of how the game recycled plot elements from the first two games, such as Super Mutants and the Enclave, saying that if his company, Troika Games, had acquired the license, he would have come up with a completely original story for the East coast. Chris Avellone, Fallout 2s main writer, described the game as having "enough options and tools at  disposal to insure  was having fun no matter what the challenges", praising the immersion in Fallouts world, the success in carrying on the legacy of the previous two games, and the fulfilling open-world component; he criticized the writing of some characters and some of gameplay's choices in balancing the skills of player character. Will Tuttle of GameSpy commended the game for its "engaging storyline, impeccable presentation, and hundreds of hours of addictive gameplay." Although Edge awarded the game 7 out of 10, in a later anniversary issue it placed the game 37th in a "100 best games to play today" list, saying "Fallout 3 empowers, engages and rewards to extents that few games have ever achieved."

Some criticisms concerned the bugs in regards to the physics and crashes, some of which broke quests and even prevented progression. The AI and stiff character animations are another common point of criticism, as is the ending. Edge stated that "the game is cumbersome in design and frequently incompetent in the details of execution", taking particular issue with the nakedness of the HUD, the clarity of the menu interface, and that the smaller problems are carried over from Oblivion. Edge liked the central story but said "the writing isn't quite as consistent as the ideas that underpin" and that the "voice-acting is even less reliable."

Sales
During first week of publication, Fallout 3 beat all previous Fallout chapters' combined sales, making 57% stronger sales than the first week's performance of Bethesda's The Elder Scrolls IV: Oblivion in 2006. As of early November 2008, Fallout 3 shipped over 4.7 million units, grossing . According to NPD Group, as of January 2009, the Xbox 360 version had sold 1.14 million units, and the PlayStation 3 version had sold 552,000 units. The Xbox 360 version was the 14th best-selling game of December 2008 in the United States, while the PlayStation 3 version was the 8th best-selling PlayStation 3 game in that region and month. The Xbox 360 version received a "Platinum" sales award from the Entertainment and Leisure Software Publishers Association (ELSPA), indicating sales of at least 300,000 copies in the United Kingdom. Sales in the United Kingdom reached 750,000 units by May 2009.

Fallout 3 was one of the most played titles in Xbox Live in 2009 and Games for Windows – Live in 2009, 2011, and 2012. In June 2015, following Fallout 4s announcement at Electronic Entertainment Expo, Fallout 3s sales were boosted up to 1000%. In November 2015, Electronic Entertainment Design and Research, a market research firm, estimated that the game had sold 12.4 million copies worldwide.

Awards and legacy
Fallout 3 won several awards following its showcasing at E3 2007. IGN gave it the Game of E3 2007 award, and GameSpot gave it the Best Role-Playing Game of E3 2007 award. Following the game's demonstration at E3 2008, IGN also gave it Best Overall RPG, Best Overall Console Game, and Overall Game of the Show for E3 2008. Game Critics Awards gave the game Best Role-Playing Game and Best of Show for E3 2008.

After its release, Fallout 3 won numerous awards from gaming journalists and websites. At the 2009 Game Developers Choice Awards, it won overall Game of the Year along with Best Writing. It was also awarded Game of the Year by IGN, GamesRadar, GameSpy, UGO Networks, Gamasutra and the Golden Joystick Awards. The game also won Xbox 360 Game of the Year from Official Xbox Magazine, GameSpy, and IGN, while winning PC Game of the Year from GamePro, GameSpy, GameTrailers and GameSpot, with the latter two also awarding it Best RPG.

At the 12th Annual Academy of Interactive Arts & Sciences Awards, now known as the D.I.C.E. Awards, Fallout 3 won Role-Playing Game of the Year and Outstanding Achievement in Original Story, along with being nominated for Overall Game of the Year, Computer Game of the Year, Console Game of the Year, Outstanding Achievement in Game Direction, Outstanding Achievement in Game Design, and Outstanding Achievement in Gameplay Engineering.

Fallout 3 is considered to be one of the best video games of all time. At the end of 2009, Fallout 3 was featured in IGN's "Best Video and Computer Games of the Decade", with the game being placed top game of 2008 and seventh overall game of the 2000–2009 decade. Fallout 3 was voted for and won the Adventure section for the platform Modern Windows. That same year, G4tv ranked it as the 75th top video game of all time. IGN put Fallout 3 at number 10 in the "Top 100 RPGs of All Time" list, saying "Fallout 3 is the epitome of the deep, modern RPG and the archetype that many developers will mimic moving forward."

In 2012, Fallout 3 was also exhibited in The Art of Video Games, at Smithsonian American Art Museum. In November 2015, Fallout 3 has been made available on Xbox One via download from Xbox Live, as part of the initial 104 titles dedicated to the backward compatibility with Xbox 360.

Technical issues on PlayStation 3
Shortly before the game's release, IGN posted a review of the game, citing numerous bugs and crashes in the PlayStation 3 release. The game also contained a bug, causing the game to freeze and the screen to blur when friends signed out of and into the PlayStation Network. The IGN review was edited shortly thereafter, removing all references to the PS3 version's bugs, causing controversy in the PlayStation communities. Reviewing PlayStation 3 Game of the Year edition, Digital Chumps and Spawn Kill confirmed that most bugs remained, citing occasional freezes, several animation and scripting issues, along with other bugs, requiring a restart of the game. IGN retroactively cited bugs with the original release as well as the Game of the Year edition, calling it "a fantastic game" but warned players to "be aware that you might have to deal with some crashes and bugs."

Controversy and fandom

Not all fans were happy with the direction the Fallout series was taken in after its acquisition by Bethesda Softworks. Notorious for their support of the series' first two games, Fallout and Fallout 2, members centered on one of the oldest Fallout fansites, No Mutants Allowed, have criticized departures from the original games' stories, gameplay mechanics and setting. Criticisms include the prevalence of unspoiled food after 200 years, the survival of wood-framed dwellings following a nuclear blast, and the ubiquity of Super Mutants at early levels in the game. Also criticized are the quality of the game's writing, its relative lack of verisimilitude, the switch to a first-person action game format, and the level of reactiveness of the surrounding game world to player actions. In response, Jim Sterling of Destructoid has called fan groups like No Mutants Allowed "selfish" and "arrogant", stating that a new audience deserves a chance to play a Fallout game; and that if the series had stayed the way it was back in 1997, new titles would never have been made and brought to market. Luke Winkie of Kotaku tempers these sentiments, saying that it is a matter of ownership; and that in the case of Fallout 3, hardcore fans of the original series witnessed their favorite games become transformed into something else.

Regional variations

Drug references
On July 4, 2008, Fallout 3 was refused classification by the Australian Classification Board (ACB) in Australia, thus making it illegal to distribute or purchase the game in the country. For the game to be reclassified, the offending content in the Australian version of the game had to be removed by Bethesda Softworks and the game resubmitted to the ACB. According to the ACB board report, the game was refused classification due to the "realistic visual representations of drugs and their delivery method [bringing] the 'science-fiction' drugs in line with 'real-world' drugs."

A revised version of the game was resubmitted to the ACB and reclassified as MA 15+ on August 7, 2008, or not suitable for people under the age of 15 unless accompanied by a parent or adult guardian; this new rating ensured that the game could retail legally in Australia. According to the ACB board report, the drug content was not removed entirely from the revised version of the game, but the animation showing the actual usage of the drugs was removed; the minority view on the decision stated that the drug content was still enough to warrant a refused classification rating.

In a later interview with UK gaming magazine Edge, Bethesda Softworks revealed that there would be only one version of Fallout 3 released worldwide, and that this version would have all real-world drug references removed. It was later clarified that the only change made would be that morphine, a real-world drug that would have appeared in the game, would instead be renamed to the more generic Med-X.

Release in India
On October 22, 2008, Microsoft announced that the game would not be released in India on the Xbox 360 platform. Religious and cultural sentiments were cited as the reason. The statement read that "Microsoft constantly endeavors to bring the best games to Indian consumers in sync with their international release. However, in light of cultural sensitivities in India, we have made the business decision to not bring Fallout 3 into the country." Although the specific reason was not revealed in public, it is possible that it is because the game contains two-headed mutated cows called Brahmin, or that Brahmin is also the name of an ancient, powerful hereditary caste of Hindu priests and religious scholars in India, or its similarity to the spelling of brahman, a type of cow that originated in India. Brahman, a breed of Zebu, are revered by Hindus.

Sensitivity in Japan
Bethesda Softworks changed the side quest "The Power of the Atom" in the Japanese version of Fallout 3 to relieve concerns about depictions of atomic detonation in inhabited areas, as the memory of the atomic bombings of Hiroshima and Nagasaki remains strong in the country. In non-Japanese versions, players are given the option of either defusing, ignoring, or detonating the dormant atomic bomb in the town of Megaton; in the Japanese version, the character of Mr. Burke is absent, making it impossible to choose the detonation option. Also in the Japanese release, the Fat Man nuclear catapult weapon was renamed Nuka Launcher, as the original name was a reference to Fat Man, the bomb used on Nagasaki. According to Tetsu Takahashi, responsible for localizing Fallout 3 to Japan under his company ZeniMax Asia, the available actions prior to localizing "The Power of the Atom" and the ability to kill civilians almost got the game banned by CERO before it received an Adult Only Rating.

See also 
 Tale of Two Wastelands

References

External links

 
 Fallout 3 at MobyGames

2008 video games
Action role-playing video games
Anti-war video games
Bethesda Game Studios games
Censored video games
Fallout (series) video games
Game Developers Choice Award for Game of the Year winners
Gamebryo games
Games for Windows certified games
Golden Joystick Award for Game of the Year winners
Interactive Achievement Award winners
Montgomery County, Maryland in fiction
Open-world video games
PlayStation 3 games
Retrofuturistic video games
Role-playing video games
Single-player video games
Spike Video Game Award winners
Video games about cannibalism
Video games developed in the United States
Video games featuring protagonists of selectable gender
Video games scored by Inon Zur
Video games set in Alaska
Video games set in Maryland
Video games set in Pennsylvania
Video games set in Pittsburgh
Video games set in the United States
Video games set in the 23rd century
Video games set in Virginia
Video games set in Washington, D.C.
Video games using Havok
Video games with alternate endings
Video games with customizable avatars
Video games with downloadable content
Video games with expansion packs
Windows games
Xbox 360 games
D.I.C.E. Award for Role-Playing Game of the Year winners